Timothy Atkins is a British field hockey player. He plays for the Scotland men's national field hockey team and plays club hockey in the Men's England Hockey League for Old Georgians Hockey Club. He is also a type 1 diabetic working closely with Diabetes UK.

His first international cap for Scotland came in March 2017 at World League 2. In August 2019, he was selected in the Scotland squad for the 2019 EuroHockey Championship.

Club career
Atkins started his hockey career at the age of 5, where he joined Wallingford Hockey Club. He has played the majority of his senior hockey career at Reading Hockey Club. Before he joined Old Georgians he played for Surbiton.

References

External links

Living people
1990 births
Male field hockey defenders
English male field hockey players
Scottish male field hockey players
Surbiton Hockey Club players
Reading Hockey Club players
Men's England Hockey League players
Scotland men's international field hockey players